Peter's Alley (Petrivska aleya) is a street in central Kyiv, the capital of Ukraine.

Named after the Russian emperor Peter the Great and the 200 Anniversary of the Battle of Poltava, it is located in the government quarter Lypky neighborhood of the Pechersk Raion. It splits two parks the City Park and the Khreshchatyi Park and connects Park Road with Hrushevsky Street.

Established in 1909–12, in 1910 over the alley was built the Park Bridge created by Evgeny Paton.

During the Nazi occupation in 1941-43 it carried a name of Benito Mussolini.

External links
 Peter's Alley at the Kiev web-encyclopedia .

Streets in Kyiv